The Merula is a  stream of Liguria (Italy).

Geography 
The creek is formed not far from the centre of Testico from the union of several streams descending the eastern slopes of Monte Torre (990 m). At first it flows down heading East and then turns South towards the Ligurian Sea. Close to its mouth, which is located in Marina di Anrora, the Marula is crossed by Autostrada dei Fiori, Genoa–Ventimiglia railway  and State highway nr.1 (Via Aurelia).

The Merula basin (49 km2) is wholly included in the Province of Savona.

Main tributaries 
 Right hand:
 rio Moltedo
 rio Domo;
 left hand:
rio Tigorella,
 rio Metta.

Nature conservation 
On the mouth of the Merula was established a nature protected area of 2.6 ha managed by the comune of Andora and called Oasi del Merula. Even if small this nature reserve is important because is one of the few wetlands available for water birds next to the Ligurian sea shore.

References

See also
 List of rivers of Italy

Rivers of Italy
Rivers of Liguria
Rivers of the Province of Savona
Rivers of the Alps
Drainage basins of the Ligurian Sea